Mitchell Peak is a solitary peak  west of the Birchall Peaks on the south side of Guest Peninsula in Marie Byrd Land, Antarctica. It was sighted by Rear Admiral Byrd on December 5, 1929, while on an airplane flight over this coast, and was named by Byrd for Hugh C. Mitchell, a mathematician of the U.S. Coast and Geodetic Survey, and a member of the National Geographic Society committee of experts which determined that Byrd reached both the North Pole and the South Pole by airplane in 1926 and 1929, respectively.

References

Mountains of Marie Byrd Land